In mathematics, the Bony–Brezis theorem, due to the French mathematicians Jean-Michel Bony and Haïm Brezis, gives necessary and sufficient conditions for a closed subset of a manifold to be invariant under the flow defined by a vector field, namely at each point of the closed set the vector field must have non-positive inner product with any exterior normal vector to the set. A vector is an exterior normal at a point of the closed set if there is a real-valued continuously differentiable function maximized locally at the point with that vector as its derivative at the point. If the closed subset is a smooth submanifold with boundary, the condition states that the vector field should not point outside the subset at boundary points. The generalization to non-smooth subsets is important in the theory of partial differential equations.

The theorem had in fact been previously discovered by Mitio Nagumo in 1942 and is also known as the Nagumo theorem.

Statement
Let F be closed subset of a C2 manifold M and let X be a vector field on M which is Lipschitz continuous. The following conditions are equivalent:

 Every integral curve of X starting in F remains in F.
 (X(m),v) ≤ 0 for every exterior normal vector v at a point m in F.

Proof
Following , to prove that the first condition implies the second, let c(t) be an integral curve with
c(0) = x in F and dc/dt= X(c). Let g have a local maximum on F at x. Then g(c(t)) ≤ g (c(0)) for t small and positive. Differentiating, this implies that g '(x)⋅X(x) ≤ 0.

To prove the reverse implication, since the result is local, it enough to check it in Rn. In that case X locally satisfies a Lipschitz condition

If F is closed, the distance function D(x) = d(x,F)2 has the following differentiability property:

where the minimum is taken over the closest points z to x in F.

To check this, let

where the minimum is taken over z in F such that d(x,z) ≤ d(x,F) + ε.

Since fε is homogeneous in h and increases uniformly to f0 on any sphere,

with a constant C(ε) tending to 0 as ε tends to 0.

This differentiability property follows from this because

and similarly if |h| ≤ ε

The differentiability property implies that

minimized over closest points z to c(t). For any such z

Since −|y − c(t)|2 has a local maximum on F at y = z, c(t) −  z is an exterior normal vector at z. So the first term on the right hand side is non-negative. The Lipschitz condition for X implies the second term is bounded above by 2C⋅D(c(t)). Thus the derivative from the right of

is non-positive, so it is a non-increasing function of t. Thus if c(0) lies in F, D(c(0))=0 and hence D(c(t)) = 0 for t > 0, i.e. c(t) lies in F for t > 0.

References

Literature
 

 

 
, Theorem 8.5.11

Ordinary differential equations
Dynamical systems
Manifolds